Gawenda is a Polish-language surname. Variant: Gawęda; Czech-language variant: Gavenda.
Notable people with this surname include:

 (1917-2000), polish lawyer, politician and statesman
Husky Gawenda, singer-songwriter and principal writer, lead singer and guitarist of an Australian indie folk band Husky
Michael Gawenda (born 1947), Australian journalist 

Polish-language surnames

pl:Gawenda